Maurizio Pisati (born in Milan in 1959) is an Italian musician and composer. 
He composes and performs his works with his group ZONE. He founded the LArecords label in 1997, he is artistic director of pactaSOUNDzone festival in Milan, and leads CSR-centro studi e ricerche and INCROCIlab at Conservatorio G. B. Martini Bologna.

Education
Maurizio Pisati graduated with highest marks in Composition, Analysis, History, Harmony and Counterpoint at the Conservatorio G. Verdi of Milan under A. Guarnieri and G. Manzoni, and in the same time studying at summer courses Darmstadt and with S. Sciarrino at Conservatorio G. Verdi, Milan, and at Specialisation Courses Città di Castello. He graduated in Guitar (again at Milan) and had a fruitful performing career between 1983 and 1989 establishing and playing in the Laboratorio Trio. Plays his own music on ElectricGuitar and LiveElectronics in his group ZONE.

Teaching
He is Professor in Element of Composition, "Invention&Interpretation", "Composition for applied music" at Conservatorio G. B. Martini in Bologna, where is also leading "CSR-centro studi e ricerche" and "INCROCIlab". 

Since 1994 to 1996 he has taught at Corsi di Perfezionamento in Bobbio and in 2004 at summer courses Novantiqua in Frascati. He has given lectures and masterclasses at Toho Gakuen University-Tokyo, Tokyo Music College, Arts Academy Reykjavik, Politecnico delle Arti-Milano, Irino Foundation-Tokyo and Universities of Vaxjö, Brisbane, Melbourne.

• C A T A L O G U E •

Discography
Ab Sofort - CD Edipan1992, Flute and Piano; Duo Zurria-Pizzo
FFA - CD RCA/ BMG Ariola1993, Tenor Recorder, Flute, Arpa; Ensemble Alter Ego
The Running Quartet - CD Ricordi/Fonit Cetra1994, Bass Clarinet, Violin, Alto, Cello; Ensemble Contrechamps
S - CD RCA/BMG Ariola1995, Tenor Sax, Tape, Live Electronics; Sax: Federico Mondelci
TAXI! - CD LArecords 1997, Words by R. Sanesi, El-MIDI Guit. M. Pisati, Recorder A. Politano,
Perc. P. Strinna, Voices E. Callegari, R. Sanesi
Il Copiafavole - CD LArecords 1998, Voices, acoustic and electronic instruments and copy machines
Ricorda I Giochi - CD “Shin-On” LArecords1999, Cymbals T. Kasuya, Fl. M. Zurria; Voice Reiko Takashi Irino, El. MIDI Guit. M. Pisati
Spiegelkontaktfabrik - CD ArsPublica2001, Didjeridoo/Oboe M. Rinaldi; AudioTrack, Mix and Editing M. Pisati
Spiegelkontaktfabrik - CD Stradivarius 2003, Electric Guitar Elena Càsoli; AudioTrack, Mix and Editing M. Pisati
ZONE-Tarkus / ZONEpopTRAIN - CD Victor Japan 2004, Aki Kuroda, Quartetto Prometeo, Elena Càsoli, Maurizio Ben Omar, Cond. Yoichi Sugiyama
TheRunningDuo-Tenor & DoubleBass Recorder. Duo Recordronik, CavalliRecords2006
CHAHACK-Guitar and AudioTrack, Sergio Sorrentino Guitar, SiltaRecords2013
Set7- Seven studies for classical guitar and seven duo for cl. guitar and seven instrument, Ruben Mattia Santorsa guitar, various artist, Kairos 2018

Works 
Umbra, Bühnenwerk für Ensemble, Tonband und Live-Elektronik, 1988
Ermengarda Bühnenwerk, 1989
-70mV für Orchester, 1989
Sette Studi für Gitarre, 1990
Ö für Tenorsaxophon und Posaune, 1991
Ab sofort für Flöte und Klavier, 1991
FFA für Recorder, Flöte und Harfe, 1993
The Running Quartet für Bassklarinette, Violine, Viola und Cello, 1994
7 für Klavier, Schlagzeug und Live-Elektronik, 1994
S für Tenorsaxophon, Tonband und Live-Elektronik, 1995
ZONE I für Flöte, Elektrogitarre und LIve-Elektronik, 1995
ZONE II für Stimme, Schlagzeug und Live-Elektronik, 1995
TAXI! Bühnenwerk für Ensemble, Tonband und Live-Elektronik, 1995
HACK für Flöte und Schlagzeug, 1996
San Moku Sen Gan für Ensemble, Tonband und Film, 1996
ZONE-Franche, Happening in Padua für Cello, Klavier, Glocken, Tonband und Live-Elektronik, 1996
ZONE II Suite für Ensemble, Tonband und Film, 1997
FUEYE für Blasorchester, 1997
ShiKaShi für zwei Recorder, Schlagzeug und Live-Elektronik, 1997
Vormittagsspuk Stummfilmmusik für Rekorder und Gitarre, 1997
SaxStories für vier Saxophone, 1998
ZONE-Alp für Flöte und Gitarre, 1998
L’Autore a chi legge für Schauspielerin, Elektrogitarre, Schlagzeug und Live-Elektronik, 1998
ZONE-d'Amore für Stimme, Elektrogitarre, Schlagzeug und Film, 1998
La Stanza degli Indizi Terrestri (nach Texten von Marina Cvetaeva und Leonardo da Vinci) für Ensemble, Tonband und Film (von Marcos Jorge), 1998
3HATSconcert für Stimme, Elektrogitarre, Schlagzeug und Film, 1998
Senti? für Gitarre und Streichorchester, 1999
STOCK ZONE-TakuHon, Bühnenwerk für Cello, Schlagzeug, Streichorchester und Tonband, 1999
Ricorda i Giochi für Frauenstimme, Flöte, Elektrogitarre, Cymbal und Live-Elektronik, 1999
CATVLLVS für Laute, Schlagzeug und Live-Elektronik, 2000
SpiegelKontaktFabrik für Oboe, Didgeridoo, Tonband und Live-Elektronik, 2000
TEI für Koto und Klavier, 2000
Samblana für Saxophon und Gitarre, 2000
Tamatebako für Schlagzeug, 2001
Il Copiafavole-ZONE, Bühnenwerk, 2001
PURPLE H für Ensemble, Tonband und Live-Elektronik, 2001
Sì, cos’è? für Schlagzeug und Streichorchester, 2003
ZONE-popTRAIN für Ensemble, 2003
Passacaglia Mit Albert für Recorder, Tonband und Live-Elektronik, 2005
QUESTIO mit der Stimme des Dichters Thor Vilhjalmsson für Trompete, Schlagzeug und Elektronik, 2006

References

 Official website
 
 
 

Kairos Page: https://www.kairos-music.com/cds/0015052kai

Musicians from Milan
Italian composers
Italian male composers
1959 births
Living people